Brian Marshall (born 1973) is an American musician and songwriter.

Brian Marshall or Bryan Marshall may also refer to:

Brian Marshall (footballer) (born 1954), English footballer
Brian Marshall (athlete) (born 1965), Canadian high jumper
Bryan Marshall (1938-2019), British actor
Bryan Marshall (jockey) in 1954 Grand National